Isak Scheel (born 19 June 1990) is a retired Norwegian football defender.

Scheel hails from Oslo, starting his career in Frigg and Ready before joining Stabæk while also attending the Norwegian College of Elite Sport.

He started his senior career in Sogndal, where he made his Adeccoligaen debut already in 2010. Ahead of the 2012 season he signed for Lillestrøm. He made his debut in for Lillestrøm in a 1-0 win to Sogndal on 20 May 2012.

The autumn of the 2012 season he was on loan to Bærum. In September 2013 he received "study leave" from Lillestrøm. He was released three months later.

Career statistics

References

1990 births
Living people
Footballers from Oslo
Norwegian footballers
Sogndal Fotball players
Lillestrøm SK players
Bærum SK players
Eliteserien players
Norwegian First Division players

Association football defenders